The 1910 Minnesota Golden Gophers football team represented the University of Minnesota in the 1910 college football season. In their 11th season under head coach Henry L. Williams, the Golden Gophers compiled a 6–1 record (2–0 against Western Conference opponents), won the conference championship, shut out their first six opponents, and outscored all opponents by a combined total of 179 to 6. The team lost only one game, falling to Michigan, 6–0, in the final game of the season.

Tackle James Walker was named an All-American by Walter Camp.  Fullback Lisle Johnston, quarterback John McGovern, halfback Reuben Rosenwald and tackle James Walker were named All-Big Ten first team.

Schedule

References

Minnesota
Minnesota Golden Gophers football seasons
Big Ten Conference football champion seasons
Minnesota Golden Gophers football